St. Mary Peribleptos, Theotokos Peribleptos and Panagia Peribleptos is a common dedication of Byzantine-era monasteries to the Virgin Mary. It may refer to:

 Peribleptos Monastery, Mystras
 Monastery of the Virgin Peribleptos in Thessaloniki, nowadays identified with the Church of Saint Panteleimon (Thessaloniki)
 Church of the Theotokos Peribleptos (Constantinople)